Arnoldi Anthony Cruz (August 18, 1986) is an American former professional baseball catcher. He was drafted by the St. Louis Cardinals in the 26th round of the 2007 MLB Draft and he made his Major League Baseball (MLB) debut with them four years later. Cruz was a member of the Cardinals 2011 World Series champion team. He also played for the Kansas City Royals and Cincinnati Reds.

Career

St. Louis Cardinals
Cruz graduated from Santaluces Community High School. From Palm Beach State College and Middle Georgia College, Cruz was selected by the St. Louis Cardinals in the 26th round (802nd overall) of the 2007 Major League Baseball Draft.  In five seasons and 400 minor league games, he batted .266 with 96 doubles, 37 home runs and 221 runs batted in (RBI).  He appeared in 231 games at catcher and 133 at third base.

On May 23, 2011, the Cardinals called Cruz up for the first time to the major leagues when they placed Gerald Laird on the 15-day disabled list (DL) with a right index finger fracture.  The next day, he made his major league debut as a starter.  He collected three hits in five at bats with two singles and a double.  He was optioned back to the minors on August 12, 2011.  He was later recalled when the Cardinals made the postseason.  Cruz served as the third-string catcher during the postseason and eventually won the 2011 World Series with the Cardinals.

On June 27, 2012, Cruz hit his first major league home run.

Cruz spent the majority of the 2013 season as the Cardinals primary backup to Yadier Molina and a pinch hitter.  When Molina went on the 15-day DL with a knee injury after the All-Star break Cruz assumed the #1 catcher role.  However, on August 15, 2013 - one day after Molina's return from the DL - the Cardinals announced Cruz was going onto the disabled list with a stress fracture of his left forearm.  He had been playing with the fracture for about a month, but it was evaluated as soreness at first, according to general manager John Mozeliak.

Kansas City Royals
On December 2, 2015, the Cardinals traded Cruz to their cross-state rivals, the Kansas City Royals for minor leaguer José Martínez. He was up and down in the majors with the Royals in 2016. He was designated for assignment on November 18, 2016, and released on November 23.

San Diego Padres
On February 7, 2017, Cruz signed a minor league contract with the San Diego Padres organization. He was assigned to the El Paso Chihuahuas, where he would spend the entire season. He elected free agency on November 6, 2017.

Cincinnati Reds
On December 19, 2017 Cruz signed a minor league deal with the Cincinnati Reds.  On May 8, 2018, Cruz was recalled from AAA Louisville after the Reds traded catcher Devin Mesoraco to the Mets for Matt Harvey. He was released on June 21.

References

External links

1986 births
Living people
Sportspeople from West Palm Beach, Florida
Baseball players from Florida
Major League Baseball catchers
St. Louis Cardinals players
Kansas City Royals players
Cincinnati Reds players
Middle Georgia Warriors baseball players
Northwest Florida State Raiders baseball players
Palm Beach State Panthers baseball players
Gulf Coast Cardinals players
Johnson City Cardinals players
Batavia Muckdogs players
Swing of the Quad Cities players
Palm Beach Cardinals players
Honolulu Sharks players
Estrellas Orientales players
Surprise Rafters players
Springfield Cardinals players
Memphis Redbirds players
Omaha Storm Chasers players
Tigres del Licey players
American expatriate baseball players in the Dominican Republic
El Paso Chihuahuas players
Louisville Bats players